The Pebble and the Penguin is a 1995 American independent animated film directed by Don Bluth and Gary Goldman. The film stars the voices of Martin Short, Jim Belushi, Tim Curry, and Annie Golden. Based on the true life mating rituals of the Adélie penguins in Antarctica, the film focuses on a timid, stuttering penguin named Hubie who tries to impress a beautiful penguin named Marina by giving her a pebble that fell from the sky and keep her from the clutches of an evil penguin named Drake who wants Marina for himself.

Towards the end of production, Metro-Goldwyn-Mayer significantly changed the movie, forcing Don Bluth and Gary Goldman to leave their film and demand to have their names taken off the film. The two would later start working at Fox Animation Studios.

The film was released in the United States on April 12, 1995, by MGM/UA Distribution Co., receiving negative reviews from critics and being a box office bomb, grossing only $3.9 million against a $28 million budget. It is the final film to be produced by Sullivan Bluth Studios before the studio went bankrupt and ceased operations.

Plot 
In Antarctica, the Adélie penguins practice a tradition where during the mating season, the male birds gather on the beaches to find a pebble to use in a mating ritual, and during the night of the full moon mating ceremony, the males propose to the female they love by presenting their pebble to them, and if they accept it, they become a married couple.

Hubie, a shy and good-hearted male penguin, loves Marina, the most beautiful penguin in the rookery who also seems to like him, but his evil archrival Drake, a muscular penguin who is said to always get his way, similarly covets Marina's affection. One night, Hubie and Marina discuss their feelings for each other, but Hubie is unable to find a suitable pebble to propose to Marina with due to both his clumsiness and the other penguins desperately trying to find pebbles too. He wishes on a star to make his dream come true, and he receives a beautiful emerald cube from the sky. The next morning, Hubie ecstatically rushes to find Marina, but Drake thwarts him and taunts him, telling him nobody will marry somebody like him. When Drake demands Hubie to give him the emerald, Hubie refuses and Drake throws him into the water. Hubie narrowly escapes from a leopard seal and climbs onto a piece of an iceberg, where he is swept away from Antarctica.

Hubie, after sleeping for three days, is picked up by humans and caged on their ship called "Misery", which transports penguins to a zoo, and meets a streetwise and cranky but virtuous Northern rockhopper penguin named Rocko. After seeing a vision where Drake tries to hound Marina into marrying him and tells her that she'll be banished if she doesn't find a mate before the mating ceremony, Hubie decides to escape with Rocko and flees, before lying low on a beach. Rocko reluctantly tells Hubie about his desire to fly and live in a tropical climate. He convinces him to help him return to Antarctica by making up a lie about a flying penguin named Waldo. They have a short fight after Rocko tries to fly off to "an authentic, ancient aviarial airstrip" and another after Rocko saves Hubie from a killer whale. The next morning, the two attempt to depart, but Hubie admits to Rocko that he lied to him about Waldo, which infuriates Rocko to the point where he attempts to attack Hubie, but soon starts laughing when Hubie does an impression of a wheezing noise, and praises Hubie's determination to return to Marina. Hubie and Rocko run into the hungry and persistent leopard seal, but are able to escape it. With that, they become true friends, and Rocko later teaches Hubie how to fight for Marina when the time will come. However, their joy is short-lived as three killer whales attack them, causing Hubie's pebble to get lost in the scuffle and Rocko to go missing, leaving Hubie to think he perished. Disheartened, Hubie eventually finds Drake's lair, and finds out that Drake had kidnapped Marina to force her to be his mate. Drake and Hubie charge at each other, but the former ends up knocking Hubie out and, thinking he won, tries carrying Marina off to the depths of his lair. Hubie, however, resuscitates and, remembering what Rocko taught him, fights Drake by doing martial arts and initially defeats him by dropkicking him off the stairway.

Hubie becomes overjoyed when Marina accepts his marriage proposal, and even more overjoyed when Rocko reveals himself to be alive. Suddenly, while reuniting, Hubie and Rocko hear Marina scream in terror as Drake lifts the stair she was standing on and, in a final attack, throws it at Hubie. The two penguins both dodge the large stone just in time. The impact considerably damages Drake's tower, with one of the slabs from the overhang crushing him instead. Rocko, however, rescues Hubie and Marina as the tower collapses while somehow becoming able to fly. When they arrive at the ceremony, Rocko gives Hubie his pebble, and he presents it to Marina, and she tells him that she loves his pebble, but loves him even more and the two become mates. Rocko decides to stay in Antarctica, with the film closing on him teaching Hubie and Marina's offspring how to fly.

Cast and characters 
 Martin Short as Hubie, a shy and kind-hearted Adélie penguin.
 Annie Golden as Marina, a beautiful female penguin.
 Jim Belushi as Rocko, a grumpy, but streetwise Northern rockhopper penguin with dreams of flying.
 Tim Curry as Drake, a vain and dark-hearted penguin who wants Marina to be his mate.
 Alissa King as Petra
 Louise Vallance as Priscilla and Chinstrap 2
 Will Ryan as Royal and Tika
 Neil Ross as Scrawny
 Stan Jones as McCallister
 S. Scott Bullock as Chubby and Gentoo
 Philip L. Clarke as King
 Shani Wallis as the narrator
 B. J. Ward as Magellanic 1
 Hamilton Camp as Megellenic 2
 Angeline Ball as Gwynne and Chinstrap 3
 Kendall Cunningham as Timmy
 Pat Musick as Pola and Chinstrap 1
 Michael Nunes as Beany
 Maggie Roswell as additional voices

Production

Conception 
The Animated Movie Guide said "considering the artistic and financial success of Disney's Beauty and the Beast, Don Bluth and Gary Goldman decided to cater to the dating crowd, in addition to preschoolers". The Pebble and the Penguin was produced by Don Bluth Ireland Limited. Production began in November 1991. The working title of the film was A Penguin Story. In 1994, "Bluth spoke enthusiastically of such pending projects as The Pebble and the Penguin and A Troll in Central Park". The film was originally slated for release in summer 1994 (while Thumbelina was scheduled for November 1993 and A Troll in Central Park was scheduled for March 1994), but due to some production difficulties (and probably to avoid competition with The Lion King, Baby's Day Out, Speed, and Forrest Gump), the film's release date was changed to April 1995.

Animation and research 
Though Bluth Productions was based in Dublin, artists from Ireland, England and Hungary worked on the project, at least seven directing animators working on the film; among them John Pomeroy. The penguins in the film are clothed. Humans wearing penguin costumes were filmed and then used as photostat references for the animators. The iconic quote from Hubie, "Goodness glaciers!" as well as his overall appearance, is a sly reference to Gentleman Glacier, an old Canadian newspaper cartoon used to illustrate snow accumulation each year. Only two scenes in the film were "augmented by computer animation", one of which being "The Good Ship Misery" song sequence. The opening credit and overture sequence has the animated penguin characters playing and dancing on the sheet music for the songs in the film. According to The Free Lance–Star, the animators researched for the film by "watching documentaries and visiting zoos, such as San Diego's SeaWorld and Scotland's Glasgow Zoo". The site added that in promotional material, the animators explained they "discovered that the land of snow and ice shines with many different hues".

Production problems 
During a late stage in the production, MGM insisted for numerous changes to be made to the film, such as removing some characters, trimming down some sequences, scenes being cut from the final product, and having the voices be re-recorded. As a result, the animation, in particular the special effects, fell behind and to make sure the movie made it to the deadline, additional coloring had to be done at Reflex Animation Ltd, a Hungarian animation studio. Don Bluth and Gary Goldman were so dissatisfied with the changes MGM was insisting that they left during production (to help set up Fox Animation Studios) and demanded to be uncredited as the directors. The book Animated Films said, "changes at MGM during production...resulted in the project being affected in terms of production value". In a 2001 edition of his magazine Toon Talk, Bluth admitted: "Penguin had story problems. We knew it. The crew knew it". Though he attempted to fix these issues when his Irish studio got taken over by the Hong Kong company Media Assets, "the story and film were now compromised", so neither he nor Goldman stayed. They had their names removed from the film's credits and accepted an offer by Bill Mechanic – 20th Century Fox's then-president – to set up a new animation studio in the US (which would become Fox Animation Studios). Bluth said to his animation crew, "I can't chew with someone else's mouth". Despite this executive interference, The Animated Movie Guide noted MGM/UA producer Walter Mirisch's comments on the film: "I think it's one of Don's best films ever...There's no issue of our claiming the credit for this. It's his film".

Music 

The songs were written by Barry Manilow, who previously wrote the songs for Thumbelina, along with longtime collaborator and lyricist Bruce Sussman. The film's score was composed by Mark Watters. Manilow, who had "started off wanting to be a composer", got an opportunity to do this when he was approached to "compose songs and the underscore" for the film and Thumbelina. The songs and score for the soundtrack were both performed by the Irish Film Orchestra and the Irish Chamber Choir. Barbadian singer Geoffrey Holder sang the deleted song "The Beachmaster" for the film.

An accompanying soundtrack was released on April 11, 1995. This soundtrack is currently out of print. The soundtrack includes various artists with actors singing their parts for the film, including Martin Short, Annie Golden, Tim Curry, and James Belushi among others. The album was given a rating of 2 and a half stars at Allmusic.com. Reviewer Peter Fawthrop wrote: "Barry Manilow's soundtrack would have upped the mediocrity on a better project, but The Pebble and the Penguin as a film was conceived with such dismal effort from the then struggling Don Bluth studio that the songs and score work on a somewhat passing level".

The version of "Now and Forever" sung by Barry Manilow and Sheena Easton is not on the soundtrack, but was later put on Barry Manilow album Duets and a later reissue of this soundtrack as a bonus track when Kid Rhino re-acquired the rights to the soundtrack in 2012.

Songs 
Original songs performed in the film include:

Release

Theatrical 
The Pebble and the Penguin was released in the United States and Canada on April 12, 1995. When the film was nearing completion, Metro-Goldwyn-Mayer purchased the distribution rights in North America, while Warner Bros. under its Family Entertainment label obtained the foreign distribution rights.

Marketing 
The film's tagline was "The adventure of a lifetime begins with one small pebble". Seventy-five readers of the San Antonio Express-News each won four tickets to the film. The special showing was held at 11 a.m. on April 8 at the Embassy Theater in San Antonio. The Pebble and the Penguin was cross-promoted with Anheuser-Busch's Sea World Parks.

Driving Mr. Pink 
The Pebble and the Penguin was accompanied in its theater run by a new Pink Panther short entitled Driving Mr. Pink in the United States, which was adapted from an episode of the successful Pink Panther TV series (though The Pebble and the Penguin was accompanied in its theater run by a new Looney Tunes short entitled Carrotblanca internationally). The short was directed by Charles Grosvenor and Byron Vaughns, and the lead animator was David Feiss, who would go on to create Cow and Chicken and I Am Weasel. The short also featured the character of Voodoo Man from the 1995 TV show. It is a late one-off short in the Pink Panther short series – they were abundant and popular until 1980. The San Francisco Chronicle critic Peter Stack described the short as "loud, obnoxious, [and] idiotic".

Reception

Box office 
The Pebble and the Penguin did poorly at the box office, grossing a little over $3.9 million against a $28 million budget, mainly because it was overshadowed by A Goofy Movie which was released five days earlier. However, the movie became popular among audiences and later gained a cult following through home video releases.

Critical reception 

Upon release, the film received generally negative reviews from critics. On Rotten Tomatoes the film has a rating of 18% based on 11 reviews, with an average rating of 4/10. The film was given a Two Thumbs Down rating on Siskel & Ebert, with Gene Siskel noting that the film's animation looks "cheap and unfinished" and that "none of the songs are memorable"; Roger Ebert added his dislike of the "dumb songs", "silly story", and the film's color-coding of its heroes and villains. The latter took this a step further by arguing: "What do kids learn from this? Nothing overt. Just a quiet, unstated impression: White is good and brave, and brown is scheming and negative. Reinforce that through lots of cartoons (examples: Aladdin and The Rescuers Down Under) and no wonder even black children choose white dolls in some psychological experiments". The Salt Lake City-based Deseret News said, of the film, that "the songs are forgettable, the story one-note and the characterizations quite weak". Louis Black of The Austin Chronicle said the film "lacks dramatic structure and narrative drive: Songs and animated action pieces are narratively connected but the film doesn't feel as though it is an organic whole. All the elements are here, they just don't come together". Time Out wrote that "the characterisations are weak and unendearing. Worse, the big 'action' sequences turn up with the pacing and predictability of clock chimes. And, in what is perhaps the last great medium for musicals, the perfunctoriness of Barry Manilow's songs and arrangements seem guaranteed to put off yet another generation". Caryn James of The New York Times wrote that four would be "the optimum age for viewers of this gentle, animated musical", adding that "the action seems flat and low-rent compared to those earlier movies", and that it "doesn't have the vivid characters, first-rate animation or sense of adventure that turns movies like The Lion King into endlessly watchable favorites".

Washington Post Staff Writer Hal Hinson wrote that "the banality of the story, the pallid look, the flatness of the characters add up to a product that is, at best, second rate". Peter Stack of the San Francisco Chronicle said that the "gnashing whale scenes are intense enough to push the G-rating envelope". Dan Webster of The Spokesman-Review in Spokane wrote that the film "is only an average effort in virtually every respect". The Record said "the orchestration is too fancy, too loud and often drowns out the lyrics. This is a kid's movie, but musically it sounds like a full-costume Broadway show with full-supporting chorus line. It's a little disturbing to see a children's movie that perpetuates the erroneous image of killer whales as violent creatures. It is, however, a perfect indication of the limited imagination which went into writing The Pebble and the Penguin". Jane Sumner of The Dallas Morning News said the film got a "charming mating ritual" and turned into "sappy action romance with celebrity voices". The book Contemporary North American Film Directors suggested that the film suffered from containing elements of "the same unimaginative and clichéd Disney of the 1970s that Bluth had been so critical of". The Animated Movie Guide said, "the hero was a stuttering wimp, the songs didn't advance the plot, the dialogue was incessant and superfluous, and the pacing was plodding and dull", and also said the film was an "utter waste of talent and resources", due to interference from external forces.

Some critics did praise various aspects of the film, particularly in regard to Bluth's animation. These reviews, however, were almost exclusively mixed. Common Sense Media said that "the background animation of capricious weather conditions is lovely, as are the top-notch original songs by Barry Manilow and Mark Watters". The Deseret News wrote: "Bluth's strength continues to be colorful, classical-style animation, and there are some gorgeous moments here — especially some underwater sequences". The Austin Chronicle wrote: "The Pebble and the Penguin features some beautifully animated sequences [...] The characters are great and the voice talents of Martin Short...and James Belushi...are terrific". Variety said the film has a "heartwarming story, some lively songs and professional animation", adding that it is "a sweet, enjoyable romantic tale more likely to succeed as an afternoon diversion on home video than on the big screen". James wrote "the tunes Mr. Manilow has written for the movie are, like his familiar pop standards, bouncy and catchy", and commented that "the animation is fine". Hinson wrote that "a flourishing opening number—titled 'Here and Now'—proves that Short can belt out a song with the best of them", adding that the "Bluth studio style of animation is passable, and, in the case of a Brecht-Weill flavored production number, occasionally inspired".

Stack described the "show-tune-style songs" as "pleasant but forgettable", adding that "the singing by Short, Belushi, Curry and Broadway belter Golden is the best thing about the film". It also noted that "one of the obvious obstacles was how to color a film whose natural shadings tend toward black, white and degrees of gray. The result is a lot of odd but fascinating colorations -- the sky might turn up yellow at times, or the sea a deep maroon". Webster wrote "in an era when G-rated movies are as rare as Hollywood humility, any attempt at family entertainment should be lauded", adding "let us salute Don Bluth and his team of animators". In a rare case, The Daily Gazette in Schenectady gave the film 4 stars. Monica Sullivan of Movie Magazine International noted that the film was "heartily enjoyed by the two little girls who saw it with me at a kiddie matinee".

Awards 
The 2007 DVD release of The Pebble and the Penguin was nominated for a Satellite Award for "Best Youth DVD" from the International Press Academy but was beaten by Disney and Pixar's Ratatouille.

|-
| 2007
| The Pebble and the Penguin
| Satellite Award for Best Youth DVD
| 
|}

Home media 
The Pebble and the Penguin was released on VHS and LaserDisc by MGM/UA Home Video on August 15, 1995.

Throughout 1997, songs from the film were released alongside others from the MGM vaults in four MGM Sing-Along cassettes released by MGM/UA Home Video. The loosely themed tapes had titles such as "Searching for Your Dreams", "Having Fun", and "Being Happy". The Pebble and the Penguin was first released by MGM Home Entertainment on DVD on January 19, 1999.

A "Family Fun Edition" of the film was released only in the United States and Canada on March 27, 2007, by 20th Century Fox Home Entertainment. Though, they were initially unsatisfied with how the movie turned out, Don Bluth and Gary Goldman returned to supervise the restoration for the "Family Fun Edition", which features color corrections, refielded scenes to hide missing effects and correct other errors from the theatrical and LaserDisc releases and the VHS and un-restored 1999 print of the DVD releases. The Family Fun Edition was nominated for the Satellite Award for Best Youth DVD.

The 2007 DVD release of The Pebble and the Penguin was, according to The Hindu News, a part of a wave of penguin-related media consisting of March of the Penguins, Happy Feet, Farce of the Penguins and Surf's Up. This trend was also picked up on by The Paramas Post and The Age. In 2010, the film was re-released, along with Rock-a-Doodle, as a double-sided DVD, but the DVD print utilized is the open matte and un-restored 1999 DVD.

The film was released on Blu-ray for the first time on October 11, 2011.

References

Notes

External links 

 
 The Pebble and the Penguin at the TCM Movie Database
 
 
 
 

1995 films
1995 animated films
1990s American animated films
1995 fantasy films
1990s musical comedy films
1995 romantic comedy films
American buddy films
American children's animated adventure films
American children's animated comedy films
American children's animated fantasy films
American children's animated musical films
American fantasy comedy films
Animated films about friendship
Animated buddy films
Animated films about penguins
Films directed by Don Bluth
Films directed by Gary Goldman
Films produced by Don Bluth and Gary Goldman
Films produced by John Pomeroy
Films scored by Mark Watters
Films set in Antarctica
Films set in Brazil
Metro-Goldwyn-Mayer films
Metro-Goldwyn-Mayer animated films
Sullivan Bluth Studios films
1990s children's animated films
1990s English-language films
American independent films